MMC may stand for:

Business
Mail.com Media Corp., a former name of the US digital media company PMC
Marsh & McLennan Companies, an American-based global professional services firm
Master Municipal Clerk, a certification in the US for a municipal clerk
Material Móvil y Construcciones (MMC), a predecessor company to Construcciones y Auxiliar de Ferrocarriles
MMC Corporation Berhad, a Malaysian investment holding company
MMC Norilsk Nickel (Nornickel), a Russian mining and smelting company
MMC Ventures, a UK venture capital firm that has funded companies such as Boticca
Monopolies and Mergers Commission, the former name of the British Competition Commission
MyMajorCompany, a fan-funded music label based in the United Kingdom and France
Maudslay Motor Company, a British maker company based in Coventry
Mitsubishi Motors Corporation, a Japanese multinational car maker company

Computing
M/M/c queue, a multi-server queueing model
Memory management controller, a special series of microprocessors designed to expand the capabilities of certain games for the Nintendo Entertainment System
Microsoft Management Console, a framework for system administration tools in modern Microsoft Windows operating systems
MIDI Machine Control, part of the MIDI specification
Mobile-to-mobile convergence, a technology used to handle wireless traffic in telephony and computer networks
Multimedia Center, Zagreb, Croatia, a Multimedia Center of the Zagreb University Referral Center
MultiMedia Commands, a multimedia command set for computer storage buses
MultiMedia controller, such as the eMMC
MultiMediaCard, a solid state disk or flash memory data storage device
Malicious mobile code, malware

Education
Martin Methodist College, a private, liberal arts college located in Pulaski, Tennessee, U.S.
Marymount Manhattan College, a liberal arts college located in Manhattan, U.S.
Miles Macdonell Collegiate, a high school in Winnipeg, Manitoba, Canada

Medicine
The Marine Mammal Center, an institution for marine mammal research and medicine
Medical male circumcision
Methenmadinone caproate, a progestin that was never marketed
Migrating motor complex, a cleaning reflex of the gastrointestinal tract
Mitomycin C, a DNA crosslinker used in cancer treatment as an anti-tumour antibiotic chemotherapeutic agent
Modernising Medical Careers, covering the changes to post-graduate medical training in the United Kingdom
Myelomeningocele, a kind of Spina bifida congenital defect of the spine

Hospitals and medical colleges
Mackay Medical College, a medical college in New Taipei City, Taiwan
Madras Medical College, a medical college in Chennai, Tamil Nadu, India
Magadh Medical College, a medical college in Gaya, India
Maine Medical Center, a hospital in Portland, Maine, U.S.
Makati Medical Center, a tertiary hospital in Makati, Philippines
Medicaid managed care, managed care organizations (MCOs) that accept a set payment – “capitation” – for these services
Meharry Medical College, a medical college in North Nashville, Tennessee, U.S.
Memorial Medical Center (Springfield, Illinois), a hospital in Springfield, Illinois, U.S.
MetroWest Medical Center, a teaching hospital in Framingham, Massachusetts, U.S.
Metropolitan Medical Center, a tertiary hospital in Tondo, Manila, Philippines
Monash Medical Centre, a tertiary hospital in Clayton, Victoria, Australia
Montefiore Medical Center, a hospital in the Bronx, New York, U.S.
Muhammad Medical College, a medical college in Mirpurkhas, Sindh, Pakistan
Mymensingh Medical College, a medical college in Mymensingh, Bangladesh

Transport
Mitsubishi Motors Corporation, a Japanese automobile company
Merchant Mariner Credential, a professional qualification document for those in the maritime industry
Moore Market Complex, a terminus in Chennai, Tamil Nadu, India
Morgan Motor Company, a British car manufacturing company
Morris Motors, a former British car manufacturing company
Minor model change, another term for an automotive facelift

Other uses
4-MMC (4-Methylmethcathinone), a stimulant drug
Alexander Dennis Enviro200 MMC, a single-decker city bus manufactured by Alexander Dennis
Alexander Dennis Enviro400 MMC, a 2-axle bus model manufactured by Alexander Dennis
Alexander Dennis Enviro500 MMC, a 3-axle double-decker bus manufactured by Alexander Dennis
Madhavaram Milk Colony, a neighbourhood in northern part of the city Chennai, Tamil Nadu, India
Member of the Magic Circle, initials used after one's name to denote membership to The Magic Circle
Manang Marsyangdi Club, a leading football club in Nepal
Matara Municipal Council, the local council for Matara, Sri Lanka
Maximum material condition
Member of Municipal Council, a member of municipal councils in Sri Lanka
Metal matrix composite, a type of composite material with fibers dispersed in a metallic matrix
Mickey Mouse Club, a long-running children's variety television series
Mini Magellanic Cloud, a separated section of the Small Magellanic Cloud galaxy
Manbij Military Council, a military council established by the Syrian Democratic Forces 
Modular Multi-Level Converter, a sort of power electronics converter
Moving Micro Cross, a cartridge type developed by Bang & Olufsen to replace ceramic pickups in high fidelity systems
Multi-member constituency, part of an election system; see Electoral district
Museum Management and Curatorship, a journal
The Roman numerals for 2100